There were two general elections held in England in 1701:

 January 1701 English general election
 November 1701 English general election